The Star of Valencia (French: L'étoile de Valencia) is a 1933 drama film directed by Serge de Poligny and starring Brigitte Helm, Jean Gabin and Simone Simon. It was the French-language version of the German film The Star of Valencia. Such multi-language versions were common in the era before dubbing became widespread. While made by largely the same crew except the director, it features a completely different cast.

It was produced by UFA at the Babelsberg Studios, and distributed by the company's French subsidiary L'Alliance Cinématographique Européenne. The film's sets were designed by the art director Otto Hunte. It incorporated footage shot on location in Mallorca from the German film.

Cast
 Brigitte Helm as Marion Savedra 
 Jean Gabin as Pedro Savedra 
 Thomy Bourdelle as Le capitaine Mendoza 
 Simone Simon as Rita 
 Raymond Aimos as Un matelot 
 Joe Alex as Diego 
 Paul Amiot as Le capitaine Rustan 
 Paule Andral as Elinor 
 Paul Azaïs as Un joueur du Trocadéro 
 Christian Casadesus as Le lieutenant Diaz 
 Françoise Courvoisier as Une girl 
 Lucien Dayle as Palesco - le patron du cabaret 
 Roger Karl as Le commissaire 
 Pierre Labry as José 
 Ginette Leclerc as Une girl 
 Pierre Sergeol as Beppo - un matelot 
 Marcelle Yrven as Une girl 
 Louis Zellas as Un machinist

References

Bibliography 
 Barbara Hales, Mihaela Petrescu and Valerie Weinstein. Continuity and Crisis in German Cinema, 1928-1936. Boydell & Brewer, 2016.

External links 
 

1933 films
1933 drama films
1930s French-language films
Films directed by Serge de Poligny
UFA GmbH films
German multilingual films
German drama films
German black-and-white films
Films shot at Babelsberg Studios
Seafaring films
Films shot in Spain
Films set in Spain
1933 multilingual films
1930s German films